The 1356 Basel earthquake is the most significant seismological event to have occurred in Central Europe in recorded history and had a moment magnitude in the range of 6.0–7.1. This earthquake, which occurred on 18 October 1356, is also known as the Sankt-Lukas-Tag Erdbeben (English: Earthquake of Saint Luke), as 18 October is the feast day of Saint Luke the Evangelist.

Earthquake
After a foreshock between 19:00 and 20:00 local time, the main earthquake struck in the evening at around 22:00, and numerous aftershocks followed through that night. Basel experienced a second, very violent shock in the middle of the night. The town within the ramparts was destroyed by a fire when torches and candles falling to the floor set the wooden houses ablaze. The number of deaths within the town of Basel is estimated at 300. All major churches and castles within a  radius of Basel were destroyed.

The seismic crisis lasted a year. The modeling of the macroseismic data suggests that the earthquake's source had an east–west orientation, a direction corresponding with the overlapping faults on the Jura Front. On the other hand, recent paleoseismologic studies attribute the cause of this earthquake to a normal fault, oriented NNE-SSW and south of the town. The significant magnitude of the event suggests a possible extension of this fault under the town.

Location
Due to the limited records of the event, a variety of epicenters have been proposed for the earthquake. Some of the proposed locations include faults beneath the Jura Mountains or along the Basel-Reinach escarpment.

Intensity
The earthquake was felt as far away as Zürich, Konstanz, and even in Île-de-France. The maximum intensity registered on the Medvedev–Sponheuer–Karnik scale was IX–X (Destructive–Devastating). The macroseismic map was established on the basis of damage reported by the region's 30 to 40 castles.

From this macroseismic data, various studies have been conducted to estimate the moment magnitude of the earthquake, which have resulted in various values of 6.2 (BRGM 1998); 6.0 (GEO-TER 2002); 6.9 (SED 2004) with a follow-up report suggesting a range of between 6.7 and 7.1; 6.6 (GFZ 2006); and a major Swiss study by 21 European experts, with American involvement, in which four sub-groups estimated values of 6.9, 6.9, 6.5 to 6.9, and 6.5 ± 0.5 (PEGASOS 2002–2004). There are also different opinions about which faults were involved.

Damage
The earthquake destroyed the city of Basel, Switzerland, near the southern end of the Upper Rhine Graben, and caused much destruction in a vast region extending from Paris to Prague. Though major earthquakes are common at the seismically active edges of tectonic plates in Turkey, Greece, and Italy, intraplate earthquakes are rare events in Central Europe. According to the Swiss Seismological Service, of more than 10,000 earthquakes in Switzerland over the past 800 years, only half a dozen of them have registered more than 6.0 on the Richter scale.

See also
 
 Fessenheim Nuclear Power Plant
 Induced seismicity in Basel
 List of historical earthquakes

References

External links

Catholic Encyclopedia article on the Diocese of Basel makes mentions the earthquake
Das Grosse Beben von Basel im Jahr 1356
Critical description of the earthquake and its consequences 
Preparing a seismic hazard model for Switzerland: The view from PEGASOS Expert Group 3

Basel earthquake, 1356
Reinach, Basel-Landschaft
1356 Basel
Basel Earthquake, 1356
14th century in Switzerland
1356 Basel
History of Basel